Dichlorine pentoxide is a hypothetical chlorine oxide with a chemical formula Cl2O5. The most stable configuration of dichlorine pentoxide is unknown, but theory predicts that the perchloryl/chloride peroxide structure would be the most stable among various isomers, such as the anhydride of chloric acid or the chlorous acid/perchloric acid mixed anhydride.

See also
Dichlorine heptoxide
Dichlorine trioxide
Dichlorine monoxide
Chlorine dioxide

References

Chlorine oxides
Acid anhydrides
Hypothetical chemical compounds
Chlorine(VII) compounds
Peroxides